USH may refer to:
Ugandan shilling, the currency of Uganda
Universal Studios Hollywood, the movie studio and theme park in Los Angeles, California
Ushuaia – Malvinas Argentinas International Airport, in Ushuaia, Argentina (IATA airport code)
"U.S.H.", a song by Ho99o9 from the album United States of Horror